The Dominican Republic women's national volleyball team had its biggest win in 2003, when the squad surprisingly won the 2003 Pan American Games on home soil. Currently ranked 6th.

Results

Summer Olympics
 Champions   Runners-up   Third place   Fourth place

World Championship

 Champions   Runners up   Third place   Fourth place

World Grand Champions Cup

 Champions   Runners up   Third place   Fourth place

World Cup

 Champions   Runners up   Third place   Fourth place

World Grand Prix
 Champions   Runners-up   Third place   Fourth place

|valign="top" width=0%|

FIVB Nations League
 Champions   Runners-up   Third place   Fourth place

Pan American Games

 Champions   Runners up   Third place   Fourth place

|valign="top" width=0%|

Pan American Cup

 Champions   Runners-up   Third place   Fourth place

|valign="top" width=0%|

NORCECA Championship
 Champions   Runners-up   Third place   Fourth place

|valign="top" width=0%|

Current squad
The following is the Dominican roster in the 2020 Volleyball Olympic Games.

Head coach:  Marcos Kwiek

Notable players

 This Players list Sort Alphabetically

References

External links
Official website
FIVB profile
Team profile at 2018 World Cup

Volleyball
National women's volleyball teams
Volleyball in the Dominican Republic